Jiří Ryba (born 15 June 1976 in Tábor) is a former Czech decathlete. His personal best result was 8339 points, achieved in May 2000 in Desenzano del Garda. Ryba is married to pole vaulter Pavla Hamáčková.

Achievements

Football career
Following his career in athletics, Ryba became a fitness coach in the Gambrinus liga before moving to 1. FK Příbram as assistant manager. In 2016, he became a fitness coach in Bahrain national football team alongside Miroslav Soukup and Andrej Kostolansky.

Notes

External links

1976 births
Living people
Czech decathletes
Athletes (track and field) at the 2000 Summer Olympics
Olympic athletes of the Czech Republic
Competitors at the 2001 Goodwill Games
People from Tábor
Sportspeople from the South Bohemian Region